The MTV Video Music Award for Best Cinematography is a craft award given to both the artist as well as the cinematographer/director of photography of the music video. From 1984 to 2006, the award's full name was Best Cinematography in a Video. After a brief absence in 2007, the category acquired its current, shortened name in 2008.

The biggest winner is Harris Savides with three wins. Pascal Lebègue, Daniel Pearl, Mark Plummer, and Scott Cunningham follow with two wins each. The most nominated director of photography is Daniel Pearl with nine nominations, followed by Martin Coppen, Christopher Probst, and Jeff Cronenweth with six. Beyoncé has won the most awards in this category with 4 wins. Madonna's videos have received the most nominations with ten. Ryan Lewis is also the only performer to have won a Moonman in this category for his work as a director of photography on the video for "Can't Hold Us" in 2013. Jared Leto ("Hurricane") is the only other performer to have been nominated for his work in this category.

Recipients

References

MTV Video Music Awards
Awards established in 1984
Awards for best cinematography